This is a list of notable female art museum directors.

List

References

Female art museum directors
Art museum directors
Lists of art museums and galleries
Lists of female office-holders
Female art museum directors